Jowzeh or Juzeh may refer to:

Juzeh, Kermanshah
Jowzeh-ye Anjirak, Kermanshah Province
Jowzeh, Qom